The 1957 Tipperary Senior Hurling Championship was the 67th staging of the Tipperary Senior Hurling Championship since its establishment by the Tipperary County Board in 1887.

Thurles Sarsfields were the defending champions.

On 15 September 1957, Thurles Sarsfields won the championship after a 4–15 to 4–04 defeat of Na Piarsaigh in the final at Cashel Sportsfield. It was their 20th championship title overall and their third title in succession.

Results

Final

References

Tipperary
Tipperary Senior Hurling Championship